is a Japanese retired heptathlete. She won bronze medals at the 2011 Asian Championships and 2013 Asian Championships in the heptathlon. She was also a three-time national champion in the heptathlon.

International competition

National titles
Japanese Championships
Decathlon: 2011, 2013, 2014

References

External links

Chie Kiriyama at JAAF 

1991 births
Living people
Sportspeople from Gifu Prefecture
Japanese heptathletes
Japan Championships in Athletics winners
Chukyo University alumni